Moodnopsis decipiens is a species of snout moth, and the type species in the genus Moodnopsis. It was described by Harrison Gray Dyar Jr. in 1914. It is found in Mexico.

References

Moths described in 1914
Phycitinae